Bermecke is a stream in North Rhine-Westphalia, Germany.

Geography 
The stream initially flows north-west along the town border.

The approximately  drainage basin is drained by the Bache, Möhne, Ruhr and Rhine to the North Sea.

See also
List of rivers of North Rhine-Westphalia

Rivers of North Rhine-Westphalia
Rivers of Germany